BBC News Arabic, formerly BBC Arabic Television, is a television news channel broadcast to the Arab World by the BBC. It was launched on 11 March 2008.  It is run by the BBC World Service and funded from the British television licence fee.

History
In 1994, BBC Arabic Television was launched by Rome-based Orbit Communications Company (owned by King Fahd's cousin, Prince Khalid ibn Abdullah) and a subsidiary of the Saudi Arabian Mawarid Holding. On 21 April 1996, it was "pulled off the air" following an episode of Panorama that was critical of the Saudi Arabian government.   Ian Richardson, who set up the news department during that time blamed the short life of the channel on a clash with the owners over content.
During the short life of BBC Arabic Television, there were several angry ‘liaison meetings’ with Orbit and the guarantees of editorial independence proved to be a sour joke, only barely obscured by a thin smokescreen about the BBC's alleged failure to observe "cultural sensitivities" – Saudi code for anything not to the Royal Family's liking. When it became clear to Orbit and Mawarid that it had, in their terms, created a monster not prepared to toe the Saudi line, it was only a matter of time before there would be a final parting of the ways.

Many of the staff who worked for the original BBC Arabic Television service were eventually employed by Al Jazeera, now one of BBC Arabic Television's main competitors.

Plans to relaunch the channel were announced in October 2005 and broadcasting was to start in Autumn 2007, but was delayed until 2008. The channel eventually relaunched at 0956 GMT on 11 March 2008, with the first news bulletin airing at the top of the hour at 1000. Initially broadcasting for 12 hours a day, 24-hour programming began on 19 January 2009.

Funding
BBC Arabic Television is run by the BBC World Service. Initially it was funded from a grant-in-aid from the British Foreign Office but in 2014 funding was switched to come from the television licence that is mainly used to fund the BBC's domestic broadcasting.  The service is based in the Peel Wing of Broadcasting House in London.

In 2011, as the British government cut funding to the BBC, forcing the BBC World Service to close down its services in five languages, the government simultaneously increased funding to the BBC Arabic service, in the words of Foreign Secretary William Hague, to "assist the BBC Arabic Service to continue their valuable work in the region".

Service
BBC Arabic can also be seen via bbc.co.uk/Arabic/. The website includes a 16:9 live stream of the channel.

The channel broadcasts 24 hours a day, showing live news programmes mixed with current affairs programmes, documentaries and occasional light entertainment.

Newshour, an hour-long news bulletin is broadcast every evening at 18:00 GMT.

Other daily programmes are Nuqtat Hewar (16:06 GMT, a phone-in programme), and BBC Trending (15:00 GMT, looking at the news agenda from a social media perspective).

BBC news bulletins of either 30 or 60 minutes in duration are broadcast throughout the day, covering stories by journalists and correspondents around the world.

References

External links 

  
 Live video stream
 BBC Press Release
 The Failed Dream That Lead To Al Jazeera
 Faisal Abbas: "BBC Arabic TV 'should try to be different, " BBC 12 March 2008
 Eric Pfanner: "BBC Set to Open Its New Arab World TV Channel in New York Times 4 March 2008
 "BBC launches Arabic TV channel," BBC 11 March 2008

Television channels and stations established in 1994
Television channels and stations disestablished in 1996
Television channels and stations established in 2008
International BBC television channels
Arab mass media
Arabic-language television stations
24-hour television news channels in the United Kingdom
BBC News channels
1994 establishments in the United Kingdom